Baranskaya is a rural locality (a village) in Verkhovskoye Rural Settlement, Tarnogsky District, Vologda Oblast, Russia. The population was 28 as of 2002.

Geography 
Baranskaya is located 46 km west of Tarnogsky Gorodok (the district's administrative centre) by road. Naumovskaya is the nearest rural locality.

References 

Rural localities in Tarnogsky District